The Franklin Mountains of New Zealand are a group of peaks in the southwestern area of the South Island, located between Bligh Sound and Lake Te Anau, within Fiordland National Park.

References

Mountain ranges of Fiordland
Southern Alps